The Tour of Estonia is a road bicycle racing stage race held in Estonia. The race is organised as a 2.1 event on the UCI Europe Tour. The race was created by amalgamating two existing one-day races in Estonia that traditionally took place during the same weekend in early summer, Tallinn–Tartu GP, and Tartu GP. These two races now make up the first and second stage, respectively.

Winners

Classifications
The jerseys worn by the leaders of the individual classifications are:
  Yellow Jersey – Worn by the leader of the general classification.
  Green Jersey – Worn by the leader of the points classification.
  Red Jersey – Worn by the leader of the climber classification. 
  White Jersey – Worn by the best rider under 23 years of age on the overall classification.

References

External links

Recurring sporting events established in 2013
Cycle races in Estonia
2013 establishments in Estonia
UCI Europe Tour races
Spring (season) events in Estonia
Sports competitions in Tallinn
Sport in Tartu